Party is the fifth solo studio album by American rock singer Iggy Pop. It was released in June 1981 by record label Arista. For this record, Pop collaborated with Ivan Kral, who is best known as the guitar and bass player for Patti Smith in the 1970s.

Recording 

When Arista heard the album, they brought in former Monkees producer Tommy Boyce to remix "Bang Bang". According to Iggy Pop's autobiography I Need More, he wrote "Bang Bang" because Arista Records wanted a single and he promised them a commercial album. He originally wanted Phil Spector or Mike Chapman to produce the song. Iggy claimed he got the idea for the song from reading The Right Stuff at a local bookstore. "Eggs On Plate" was originally known as "Don't Put the Brakes On Tonight" and was originally written for Mick Ronson.

Release 

Party was released in June 1981. The album peaked at number 166 in the Billboard Top 200. "Bang Bang was released as a single the same month, charting at number 35 on the Billboard Club Play Singles Chart.

Party is the last of Pop's three albums with Arista Records, following New Values and Soldier. Buddha reissued the album in 2000 with two bonus tracks: "Speak to Me" and a cool jazz rendition of the standard "One for My Baby (and One More for the Road)".

Critical reception 

Party has been poorly received by critics.

Charlotte Robinson of PopMatters called it "a bizarre train wreck of an album". Mark Deming of AllMusic wrote "Part of Iggy Pop's unique sort of integrity is that the man doesn't seem to know how to sell out, even when he tries, and Party, one of the strangest albums of his career, is living proof."

Tour 

The Party tour was documented on the Live in San Fran 1981  CD (released in 1983) and DVD (released in 2005).<ref>{{Cite web |url=https://www.imdb.com/title/tt1169988/ |title=IMDb - Live in San Fran 1981 - 2005-04-19th DVD, Target Video (DR-4438) US |access-date=2018-07-01 |archive-date=2017-02-10 |archive-url=https://web.archive.org/web/20170210083348/http://www.imdb.com/title/tt1169988/ |url-status=live }}</ref> This performance was filmed on November 25, 1981 at the Warfield Theatre on Market Street in San Francisco.

Tour personnel
 Iggy Pop – vocals
 Carlos Alomar – guitar
 Gary Valentine – guitar
 Rob Duprey – guitar
 Michael Page – bass guitar
 Clem Burke – drums

Noticeably absent from tour was the album's guitarist and song co-writer Ivan Král.

 Track listing 

 Personnel 
 Iggy Pop – vocals
 Ivan Kral – guitar, keyboards
 Rob Duprey – guitar
 Michael Page – bass guitar
 Dougie Bowne – drums
 Jimmy Whizner – arrangements on "Sea of Love", "Bang Bang" and "Time Won't Let Me"
 Uptown Horns – brass on "Pleasure", "Sincerity", "Houston Is Hot Tonight" and "Happy Man"

 Charts 

Use in media
 The song "Pumpin' for Jill" was featured in the second-season episode Chuck Versus the Ex of Chuck''.

References

External links 

 

1981 albums
Iggy Pop albums
Arista Records albums
Albums produced by Thom Panunzio